Pluto Glacier is a glacier on the east coast of Alexander Island, Antarctica, 10 nautical miles (18 km) long and 4 nautical miles (7 km) wide, which flows east into George VI Sound to the north of Succession Cliffs. Although Pluto Glacier is not located within nearby Planet Heights, the glacier was named in association with the mountain range along with many other nearby glaciers that are named after planets of the Solar System. The glacier was first photographed from the air on November 23, 1935, by Lincoln Ellsworth and mapped from these photos by W.L.G. Joerg. Roughly surveyed in 1936 by the British Graham Land Expedition (BGLE). Named by the United Kingdom Antarctic Place-Names Committee (UK-APC) for Pluto, then considered the ninth (and last) planet of the Solar System, following Falkland Islands Dependencies Survey (FIDS) surveys in 1948 and 1949.

See also 
 List of glaciers in the Antarctic
 Jupiter Glacier
 Uranus Glacier
 Neptune Glacier

Further reading 
 RILEY, T., FLOWERDEW, M., & WHITEHOUSE, M. (2012), Chrono- and lithostratigraphy of a Mesozoic–Tertiary fore- to intra-arc basin: Adelaide Island, Antarctic Peninsula, Geological Magazine, 149(5), 768–782. doi:10.1017/S0016756811001002
  Jane G. Ferrigno, Alison J. Cook, Amy M. Mathie, Richard S. Williams, Jr., Charles Swithinbank, Kevin M. Foley, Adrian J. Fox, Janet W. Thomson, and Jörn Sievers, Coastal-Change and Glaciological Map of the Palmer Land Area, Antarctica: 1947–2009, U.S. Geological Survey Geologic Investigations Series Map I–2600–C, 1 map sheet, 28-p
  Sven Brysch,  Changes in climate and palaeoenvironment during the Late Jurassic–Early Cretaceous in southern South America and western Antarctica , Heidelberg, 2018

External links 

 Pluto Glacier on USGS website
 Pluto Glacier on SCAR website
 Pluto Glacier on mindat.org
 Long term updated weather forecast for Pluto Glacier

References 

Glaciers of Alexander Island